Tiago Real do Prado (born 26 January 1989), known as Tiago Real, is a Brazilian footballer who plays as a central midfielder for Saudi Arabian club Hajer.

Career
On 12 July 2022, Tiago Real joined Saudi Arabian club Hajer.

Honours
Coritiba
 Campeonato Paranaense: 2010
 Campeonato Brasileiro Série B: 2010

Joinville
 Campeonato Brasileiro Série C: 2011

References

External links

1989 births
Living people
Footballers from Curitiba
Association football midfielders
Brazilian footballers
Brazilian expatriate footballers
Campeonato Brasileiro Série A players
Campeonato Brasileiro Série B players
Campeonato Brasileiro Série C players
Bahraini Premier League players
Saudi First Division League players
Coritiba Foot Ball Club players
Associação Atlética Iguaçu players
Joinville Esporte Clube players
Sociedade Esportiva Palmeiras players
Clube Náutico Capibaribe players
Goiás Esporte Clube players
Esporte Clube Bahia players
Esporte Clube Vitória players
Associação Atlética Ponte Preta players
Vila Nova Futebol Clube players
Associação Chapecoense de Futebol players
Al-Muharraq SC players
Hajer FC players
Brazilian expatriate sportspeople in Bahrain
Expatriate footballers in Bahrain
Brazilian expatriate sportspeople in Saudi Arabia
Expatriate footballers in Saudi Arabia